This is a list of awards, winners and commendations awarded by the international World Architecture Festival (WAF).

History
In 2008, all winners were award winners. In 2009 and later, only 5 of the winners were declared award winners.

The list is compiled from the official websites of World Architecture Festival and World Buildings Directory. Where there was a discrepancy between the information on the project page and the winner list with WAF, the information from the WAF list was used. All names are spelled as in the WAF list, links may therefore lead to articles with different spellings. In some cases the projects were renamed after receiving the award.
The notes to the list contain a link to the project page with World Buildings Directory and are sorted in the same sequence as in the winner lists published by the World Architecture Festival.

Complete list of winners

References 
The notes to the list contain a link to the project page with World Buildings Directory, and are sorted in the same sequence as in the winner lists published by the World Architecture Festival.

Winners' references
2008 winners

2009 winners

2010 winners

Notes 2011 winners 

2012 winners 

2013 winners

Other references

External links
 Official World Architecture Festival website
 Official World Buildings Directory website

World Architecture Festival winners
World Architecture Festival
World Architecture Festival winners
World Architecture Festival winners